"How Do You Want Me to Love You?" is a song by English boy band 911. It was released through Virgin Records on 22 June 1998 as the third and final single from their second studio album Moving On. It was their seventh consecutive top 10 hit single in the UK, peaking at No. 10.

Charts

References

1998 songs
1998 singles
911 (English group) songs
Virgin Records singles
Songs written by Carl Sturken and Evan Rogers